The 2020–21 season will be Fudbalski Klub Partizan's 74nd season in existence and the club's 15th competing in the Serbian SuperLiga.

Transfers

In

Out

Players

Squad

Friendlies

Competitions

Overview

Serbian SuperLiga

Regular season

League table

Results by matchday

Results

Serbian Cup

UEFA Europa League

Statistics

Squad statistics

|-
! colspan=14 style="background:black; color:white; text-align:center;"| Goalkeepers

|-
! colspan=14 style="background:black; color:white; text-align:center;"| Defenders

|-
! colspan=14 style="background:black; color:white; text-align:center;"| Midfielders

|-
! colspan=14 style="background:black; color:white; text-align:center;"| Forwards

|-
! colspan=14 style="background:black; color:white; text-align:center;"| Players transferred out during the season

Goal scorers

Last updated: 15 May 2021

Clean sheets

Last updated: 26 May 2021

Disciplinary record

Last updated: 26 May 2021

Game as captain 

Last updated: 26 May 2021

References

FK Partizan seasons
Partizan